The 1970 Michigan Wolverines football team was an American football team that represented the University of Michigan in the 1970 Big Ten Conference football season. In their second season under head coach Bo Schembechler, the Wolverines compiled a 9–1 record, tied for second place in the conference, and outscored opponents by a total of 288 to 90. Michigan's victories included intersectional contests with Arizona (20–9), Washington (17–3), and Texas A&M (14–10). The team won its first nine games before losing to rival Ohio State and was ranked No. 7 in the final UPI Poll and No. 9 in the final AP Poll

Quarterback Don Moorhead and middle guard Henry Hill were selected as the team's most valuable players. The team's statistical leaders included Moorhead with 1,167 passing yards, tailback Billy Taylor with 911 rushing yards and 66 points scored, and split end Paul Staroba with 519 receiving yards.

Offensive tackle Dan Dierdorf was a consensus first-team choice for the 1970 All-America team. Henry Hill received first-team All-America honors from the Central Press Association, and linebacker Marty Huff was similarly honored by the American Football Coaches Association. In addition, 10 Michigan players received first-team honors on the 1970 All-Big Ten Conference football team.

The Wolverines entered the season knowing they would not play in a bowl game. Big Ten rules in place until 1975 allowed only the team representing the conference in the Rose Bowl to participate in the postseason; additionally, the Big Ten had a "no repeat" rule barring appearances in consecutive Rose Bowls until 1972.

Schedule

Season summary

Preseason
The 1969 Michigan team compiled an 8–3 record (6–1 Big Ten), won the Big Ten championship, and was ranked No. 9 in the final AP Poll. Key players from the 1969 team who did not return in 1970 included All-American tight end Jim Mandich, All-American defensive back Tom Curtis, and fullback Garvie Craw. Most key letter winners from the 1969 team did return in 1970, including quarterback Don Moorhead, offensive tackles Dan Dierdorf and Jack Harpring, middle guard Henry Hill, linebacker Marty Huff, wolfman Thom Darden, and running backs Billy Taylor and Glenn Doughty. Jim Betts, backup quarterback in 1969, was moved to defensive back for the 1970 season.

In June 1970, Michigan hired Tirrel Burton as an assistant coach.  He began in 1970 as the coach of the freshman football team, later coached receivers from 1972 to 1980 and then took over as the running backs coach from 1980 to 1992.

Michigan's 1970 recruiting class included Dave Brandon, Dave Gallagher, Clint Haslerig, Mike Hoban, Paul Seal, Ed Shuttlesworth, Tom Slade, and Bob Thornbladh.

Arizona

    
    
    
    
    
    
    

On September 19, Michigan opened its 1970 season with a 20–9 victory over Arizona, before a crowd of 80,386 at Michigan Stadium. Michigan took a 10–0 lead in the first quarter on a 42-yard field goal from Dana Coin and a touchdown pass from Don Moorhead to Billy Taylor covering 29 yards.  Michigan's offense stalled in the second and third quarters, and Arizona closed the gap to one point (10–9) on three Steve Hurley field goals.  Michigan extended the lead in the fourth quarter on a second field goal from Dana Coin and a touchdown run by Lance Scheffler.  Michigan's defense also intercepted four of Brian Linstrom's passes.

Despite the win, Michigan's offense was criticized for its inconsistent play. Michigan gained only 186 rushing yards and had two drives stall inside Arizona's 25-yard line with no points scored. On another drive, Michigan had a first down at Arizona's five-yard line and was forced to settle for a field goal. Coach Schembechler acknowledged: "Our running game especially was a disappointment. We just weren't blocking. We've got a lot of work to do. But don't underestimate the fact that we won.  That's the important thing." A Michigan field goal was also blocked, and a punt was fumbled by Michigan's returner. 

In response to coach Schembechler's play calling, the crowd at Michigan Stadium began booing, mostly from the student section, in the third and fourth quarters. After the game, coach Schembechler responded: "Yeah, I heard them boo me. But if you think it bothered me, you're wrong. I may not be a very good coach but I'm a lot smarter than they are."

Washington

    
    
    
    

On September 26, 1970, Michigan, ranked No. 10 in the UPI poll, defeated Jim Owens' No. 19 Washington Huskies by a 17–3 score before a crowd of 57,500 at Husky Stadium in Seattle. The Huskies had beaten Michigan State, 42–16, the week before. 

Washington out-gained Michigan in the first half by 145 yards to 56 yards. Steve Wiezbowksi kicked a 35-yard field goal for a 3–0 lead at halftime. The deficit would have been greater were it not for three interceptions of passes from Washington's highly-touted Native American quarterback Sonny Sixkiller.

With Michigan tailback Glenn Doughty ineffective (13 yards on seven carries) and Lance Scheffler sidelined by injury, coach Schembechler sent third-string tailback Preston Henry into the game for the second half. Henry rushed for 113 yards and two touchdowns on 13 carries.  Dana Coin also kicked a 39-yard field goal. The defense also stiffened in the second half, as the Wolverines out-gained the Huskies, 226 yards to 56 yards. Thom Darden led the defense with 10 solo tackles and two assists.

Texas A&M

On October 3, 1970, Michigan defeated Gene Stallings' Texas A&M Aggies by a 14–10 score before a crowd of 71,732 at Michigan Stadium. One week earlier, Texas A&M was beaten by Ohio State, 56–13, but Michigan's offense was unable to move the ball effectively against the Aggies.

Texas A&M, which stunned eventual Southeastern Conference champion LSU 20-18 in Baton Rouge Sept. 19, took a 10–0 lead in the second quarter on a 10-yard touchdown run by Steve Burks and a 21-yard field goal by Pat McDermott. Michigan narrowed the gap in the second quarter after Texas A&M dropped a punt and Michigan recovered at the Aggies' eight-yard line. Billy Taylor scored on a one-yard run, and Texas A&M led, 10–7, at halftime.  The defense held Texas A&M scoreless in the second half, led by Pete Newell with 15 solo tackles and linebacker Marty Huff with 13 solo tackles. 

The offense continued to struggle in the second half, and quarterback Don Moorhead, who completed only three of 16 passes, was booed in the fourth quarter. Michigan won the game on a 62-yard drive with fullback Fritz Seyferth leading the way. For the game, Seyferth totaled 64 rushing yards on 11 carries. But it was Moorhead who silenced the critics by scoring the winning touchdown on a seven-yard run. Asked after the game if he heard the boos, Moorhead replied: "Yeah, I heard 'em. Let 'em boo. They booed Bo two weeks ago, but they don't know what's going on down there."

Purdue

    
    
    
    
    

On October 10, 1970, Michigan defeated Purdue, 29–0, before a crowd of 69,022 at Ross–Ade Stadium in West Lafayette, Indiana. Purdue had upset No. 3 Stanford with 26 points the prior week, and no Purdue team had been shut out since 1963.

Michigan's Billy Taylor had played at fullback in the first three games and was moved to tailback against Purdue.  He responded with 89 yards and a touchdown, though he also fumbled twice. Quarterback Don Moorhead, still sick with the flu, completed 9 of 17 passes for 92 yards and two touchdowns. After the game, coach Schembechler praised Moorhead: "He played today after being sick all week. He lost about seven pounds and was as weak as a baby, but he played quite a ballgame."

On defense, Michigan held Purdue's star running back Otis Armstrong to 11 yards on 14 carries. The defense also intercepted three passes from Purdue quarterback Chuck Piebes.

Michigan State

    
    
    
    
    
    
    
    
    

On October 17, 1970, Michigan, ranked No. 6 in the AP poll, defeated Duffy Daugherty's Michigan State Spartans by a 34–20 score at Michigan Stadium. The crowd of 103,580 was the largest to see a Michigan–Michigan State football rivalry to that point. At the start of the game, Michigan State marched down the field on a drive back capped by a 42-yard touchdown run by Eric Allen.  Allen finished the game with 156 yards. Michigan rebounded as Billy Taylor rushed for 149 yards and three touchdowns. Michigan quarterback Don Moorhead completed 12 of 19 passes for 156 yards and a touchdown. Glenn Doughty added 85 rushing yards, 68 receiving yards, and a touchdown.

Minnesota

    
    
    
    
    
    
    
    

On October 24, 1970, Michigan defeated Minnesota, 39–13, in the annual Little Brown Jug game before a homecoming crowd of 83,496 at Michigan Stadium. Quarterback Don Moorhead led the offense with 183 yards of total offense, 104 passing yards (7 of 18) and 79 rushing yards. Billy Taylor had 151 rushing yards and a touchdown on 26 carries, and fullback Fritz Seyferth added 76 yards and four touchdowns on 18 carries.

On defense, Michigan held the Gophers to 69 rushing yards. Minnesota quarterback Craig Curry came into the game as the Big Ten Conference leader in total offense, and completed 16 of 37 passes for 214 yards and a touchdown. Michigan intercepted three of Curry' passes, one each by Bruce Elliott, Thom Darden, and Jim Betts. Betts also tallied 12 solo tackles.

Wisconsin

    
    
    
    
    
    
    

On October 31, 1970, Michigan defeated Wisconsin, 29–15, before a record crowd of 72,389 at Camp Randall Stadium in Madison, Wisconsin. Michigan jumped to a 21–0 lead on two touchdowns by fullback Fritz Seyferth and one by tailback Preston Henry. Wisconsin responded with 15 points in the second quarter on a 17-yard pass from Neil Graff to Alan "A-Train" Thompson, an 87-yard punt return for touchdown by Danny Crooks, and a Roger Jaeger field goal. Michigan led, 21–15, at halftime. Neither team scored in the third quarter, and Michigan extended its lead in the fourth quarter on a 21-yard touchdown pass from Don Moorhead to Paul Staroba. The Wolverines rushed for 227 rushing yards, and Moorhead completed 11 of 22 passes for 223 yards. Michigan's defense limited Wisconsin to 79 rushing yards and 168 passing yards.

Illinois

    
    
    
    
    
    

On November 7, 1970, Michigan defeated Illinois, 42–0, before a crowd of 70,781 (the smallest of the season) at Michigan Stadium. Schembechler emptied the bench to avoid running up the score, using 54 players in the game. Tailback Billy Taylor and wingback Glenn Doughty scored two touchdowns each. Doughty had 81 receiving yards in addition to 40 rushing yards. Backup running back Lance Scheffler, a senior, rushed for 75 yards and a touchdown. Tight end Gerry Schumacher added a touchdown on a pass from Don Moorhead. Moorhead completed nine of 14 passes for 116 yards. On defense, Michigan held the Illini to 71 rushing yards and 101 passing yards and intercepted two Illinois passes.

Iowa

On November 14, 1970, Michigan, ranked No. 5 in the AP and UPI polls, defeated Ray Nagel's Iowa Hawkeyes, 55–0, before a crowd of 66,189 at Michigan Stadium. The win gave Michigan a 9–0 record for the first time since its 1948 national championship season.

Michigan's offense gained 561 yards, the third highest total in school history to that point, including 468 rushing yards. Michigan punted on its first possession (the first of only two punts in the game), but Iowa's returner touched the ball with Michigan recovering at the three-yard line to set up the first Wolverine touchdown. Billy Taylor led the offense with 189 yards and two touchdowns on 23 carries in the first three quarters. Quarterback Don Moorhead completed six of 11 passes for 88 yards and rushed for 65 yards and a touchdown. In his final home game for Michigan, Moorhead also passed Bob Chappuis as the school's all-time leader in total offense. Glenn Doughty also totaled 61 yards (36 receiving, 25 rushing). 

On defense, Michigan held Iowa to 88 rushing yards and 34 passing yards. Iowa did not cross midfield until there were 25 seconds left in the game. The defense also recovered five Iowa fumbles, including a fumble recovery in the end zone for a touchdown by Thom Darden.

Ohio State

    
    
    
    
    
    

On November 21, 1970, Michigan lost to Woody Hayes' Ohio State Buckeyes by a 20–9 score before a record crowd of 87,331 at Ohio Stadium in Columbus, Ohio. Both teams came into the game undefeated and were ranked No. 4 and No. 5, respectively, in the AP Poll.

Michigan's Lance Scheffler fumbled the opening kickoff, and Ohio State recovered the ball at Michigan's 25-yard line. Ohio State's Fred Schram kicked a 28-yard field goal for an early lead. Michigan tied the game after Jim Betts intercepted a Rex Kern pass and returned it to the Ohio State 18-yard line, setting up a 31-yard field goal by Dana Coin. Shortly before halftime, and after calling (and being granted) an extra fifth timeout, Ohio State took a 10–3 lead on a 26-yard touchdown pass from Kern to Bruce Jankowski.

Midway through the third quarter, Michigan scored on a 13-yard touchdown pass from Don Moorhead to Paul Staroba. Michigan's kick for extra point was blocked by Mike Anderson, and Ohio State led by one point.  In the fourth quarter, the Buckeyes extended their lead to four points on Fred Schram's second field goal. On the next drive, Ohio State linebacker Stan White intercepted Moorhead's pass at Michigan's 24-yard line and returned it to the nine-yard line, setting up a four-yard touchdown run by Leo Hayden.

Michigan was unable to move the ball on the ground, gaining only 37 rushing yards on 30 carries. Billy Taylor led the Wolverines with 31 yards on 15 carries. After the game, coach Schembechler noted: "We didn't move on the ground. That was the ball game. I don't know why we couldn't move . . . We didn't seem to block very much."

Forced to an air attack, Michigan quarterback Don Moorhead completed 12 of 26 passes for 118 yards. In his final game for Michigan, Moorhead established new Michigan career records for completions (199) and total passing yards (2,540).

The Buckeyes, on the other hand, moved the ball effectively with running backs Leo Hayden (117 rushing yards on 28 carries) and John Brockington (77 yards on 27 carries).  Ohio State quarterback Rex Kern also completed eight of 12 passes for 87 yards.

In his postgame interview, Ohio State coach Woody Hayes asked, "Is this our best team ever? Well, today it was. Today, this was the best we've ever been."

Award season

Two Michigan players received first-team honors on the 1969 All-America team
 Offensive tackle Dan Dierdorf was a consensus first-team All-American, receiving first-team honors from the American Football Coaches Association, Associated Press (AP), Football Writers Association of America, Newspaper Enterprise Association, United Press International (UPI), Football News, Pro Football Weekly, Time magazine, and Walter Camp Football Foundation. 
 Linebacker Marty Huff was selected as a first-team All-American by the American Football Coaches Association.
 Middle guard Henry Hill was selected as a first-team All-American by the Central Press Association.

Thirteen Michigan players received recognition from the AP and/or UPI on the 1970 All-Big Ten Conference football team: Don Moorhead at quarterback (AP-1, UPI-1), Paul Staroba at offensive end (AP-1, UPI-1), Dan Dierdorf at offensive tackle (AP-1, UPI-1), Phil Seymour at defensive end (AP-1, UPI-1), Henry Hill at defensive tackle (AP-1, UPI-1 [tie]), Pete Newell at defensive tackle (AP-1, UPI-1), Reggie McKenzie at guard (AP-2, UPI-1), Marty Huff at linebacker (AP-2, UPI-1), Billy Taylor at halfback (AP-2, UPI-1), Guy Murdock at center (UPI-1 [tie]), Mike Keller at defensive end (UPI-2), Jim Betts at defensive back (UPI-2), and Jack Harpring at tackle (AP-2).

Team awards were presented at the end of the season as follows:
Most Valuable Player: Henry Hill, Don Moorhead
Meyer Morton Award: Jim Betts
John Maulbetsch Award: Tom Coyle
Frederick Matthei Award: Bruce Elliott
Arthur Robinson Scholarship Award: John Harpring

Personnel

Full roster

Offensive starters
William J. "Bill" Berutti, wingback, senior, Franklin, Ohio - started 1 game at fullback
Thomas J. Coyle, offensive guard, sophomore, Chicago, Illinois - started 8 games at right guard
Dan Dierdorf, offensive tackle, senior, Canton, Ohio - started all 10 games (9 at right tackle, 1 at left tackle)
Glenn Doughty, tailback, junior, Detroit, Michigan - started all 10 games (8 at left halfback, 1 at right halfback and 1 at fullback)
Werner W. Hall, offensive guard, senior, Sandusky, Ohio - started 2 games at right guard
Jack Harpring, offensive tackle, senior, Cincinnati, Ohio - started all 10 games (9 at left tackle, 1 at right tackle)
Preston Henry, wingback, junior, Flint, Michigan - started 1 game at right halfback
Timothy Killian, kicker and offensive guard, senior, Lincoln Park, Michigan - started 2 games at left defensive end
Reggie McKenzie, offensive guard, junior, Highland Park, Michigan - started all 10 games at left guard
Don Moorhead, quarterback, senior, South Haven, Michigan - started all 10 games at quarterback
Guy Murdock, center, junior, Barrington, Illinois - started all 10 games at center
Michael Oldham, split end, junior, Cincinnati, Ohio - started 2 games at wide linebacker
Lance G. Scheffler, tailback, senior, Trenton, Michigan - started 1 game at fullback
Fritz Seyferth, fullback, junior, Darien, Connecticut - started 7 games at fullback and 1 game at left halfback
Paul Seymour, tight end, junior, Berkley, Michigan - started all 10 games (9 at tight end, 1 at split end)
Paul Staroba, split end, senior, Flint, Michigan - started all 10 games (9 games at split end, 1 at tight end)
Billy Taylor, fullback, junior, Barberton, Ohio - started 8 games at right halfback, 1 game at left halfback

Defensive starters
Tom Beckman, defensive tackle, junior, Chesaning, Michigan - started all 10 games (8 at left defensive tackle and 2 at right defensive end)
Jim Betts, safety, senior, Cleveland, Ohio - started all 10 games at safety
Alden J. Carpenter, defensive end, junior, Flint, Michigan - started 2 games at left defensive end
Thom Darden, defensive back, junior, Sandusky, Ohio - started 9 games at strong side defensive halfback
Donald R. Eaton, defensive back, sophomore, Lancaster, Ohio - started 1 game at wide linebacker
Bruce N. Elliott, defensive back, junior, Indianapolis, Indiana - started 7 games at weak side defensive halfback
Frank Gusich, wolf, junior, Garfield Heights, Ohio - started all 10 games at cornerback
Henry Hill, middle guard, senior, Detroit, Michigan - started all 10 games at middle guard
Marty Huff, linebacker, senior, Toledo, Ohio - started all 10 games at middle linebacker
Mike Keller, defensive end, junior, Grand Rapids, Michigan - started 7 games at right defensive end and 1 game at left defensive tackle
Edward M. Moore, linebacker, senior, Youngstown, Ohio - started 2 games at wide linebacker 1 game at left defensive tackle
Pete Newell, defensive tackle, senior, Park Ridge, Illinois - started 9 games at defensive right tackle
Bo Rather, defensive back, sophomore, Sandusky, Ohio - started 2 games at weak side defensive halfback
Philip Seymour, defensive end, senior, Berkley, Michigan - started 7 games at defensive end
Tony L. Smith, defensive tackle, sophomore, Detroit, Michigan - started 1 game at right defensive tackle
Mike Taylor, linebacker, junior, Detroit, Michigan - started 5 games at wide linebacker, 1 game at weak side defensive halfback and 1 game at strong side defensive halfback

Professional football
Fifteen members of the 1970 team went on to play professional football. They are: Tom Beckman (St.Louis Cardinals, 1972, Memphis Grizzlies, 1974-1975), Thom Darden (Cleveland Browns, 1972-1981), Dan Dierdorf (St. Louis Cardinals, 1971-1983), Glenn Doughty (Baltimore Colts, 1972-1979), Marty Huff (San Francisco 49ers, 1972; Edmonton Eskimos, 1973; Charlotte Hornets, 1974-1975), Mike Keller (Dallas Cowboys, 1972), Reggie McKenzie (Buffalo Bills, 1972-1982; Seattle Seahawks, 1983-1984), Guy Murdock (Houston Oilers, 1974; Chicago Fire/Winds, 1974-1975), Pete Newell (BC Lions, 1971); Bo Rather (Miami Dolphins, 1973, 1978; Chicago Bears, 1974-78); Fritz Seyferth (Calgary Stampeders, 1972); Paul Seymour (Buffalo Bills, 1973-1977), Paul Staroba (Cleveland Browns, 1972; Green Bay Packers, 1973), Billy Taylor (Calgary Stampeders, 1972), and Mike Taylor (New York Jets, 1972–73).

Coaching staff
Head coach: Bo Schembechler
Assistant coaches: 
 Jim Young - defensive coordinator
 Chuck Stobart - offensive backfield coach
 Jerry Hanlon - offensive line coach
 Dick Hunter - defensive backfield coach
 Frank Maloney - defensive line coach
 George Mans - offensive ends coach
 Gary Moeller - defensive ends coach
 Larry Smith - offensive interior line coach
 Tirrel Burton - freshman coach
 Graduate assistants: Bob Baumgartner, Dennis Brown, Don Busslow, Jeff Green, Mike Hankwitz, Paul Johnson, Jerry Miklos, and Tom Weinman
Trainer: Lindsy McLean
Assistant trainers: Mike Willie, Len Paddock, and Jack Redgren
Manager: Neil Hiller
Assistant managers: Chuck Quebberman, David Fish, Jerry Fine, Gary Johnson, John Levine

Statistical leaders

Rushing

Passing

Receiving

Kickoff returns

Punt returns

References

External links
  1970 Football Team -- Bentley Historical Library, University of Michigan Athletics History

Michigan
Michigan Wolverines football seasons
Michigan Wolverines football